Bakula or Bakuła is a surname. Notable people with the name include:

 Andrea Bakula (born 1981), Croatian table tennis player
 Hanna Bakuła (born 1950), Polish painter, scenographer, and columnist
 Marijan Bakula (born 1966), Bosnian football player
 Scott Bakula (born 1954), American actor

See also
 
Bakuła, village in Poland

Croatian surnames
Polish-language surnames